Robert Ford (born 22 September 1974) is an English former professional footballer who played for Oxford United and Sheffield United.

Biography
Born in Bristol, Ford began his career as a trainee at Oxford, signing a professional contract in 1992. In November 1997, Sheffield United bought him for £400,000. In 2002, he returned to Oxford on a free transfer, scoring once in his second spell at the club against Boston United, before retiring from professional football in July 2003. After a break from football, in January 2004 he signed for Bath City, where he spent almost two years, before retiring permanently.

References

1974 births
Living people
English footballers
Footballers from Bristol
Oxford United F.C. players
Sheffield United F.C. players
Bath City F.C. players
English Football League players
Association football midfielders